The Labor Party is a left-wing political party in Taiwan, founded on 29 March 1989 by a striking trade union in Xinpu, Hsinchu County. It is part of the wider labor movement in Taiwan, and advocates for labor reforms and the redistribution of social resources. The party also supports the unification of Taiwan with mainland China, with a high level of autonomy reserved for Taiwan under the "one country, two systems" principle.

Party members often assist in unionizing workers and regularly hold protests against the government's labor policies, as well as perceived imperialism from the United States and Japan.

History 
The Labor Party was founded on 29 March 1989 by unionized workers of the Far East Synthetic Fiber Company in Xinpu, Hsinchu County. The trade union had been protesting the company's mass layoffs and refusal to increase workers' wages; the protests culminated in the  a month later. When establishing the party, the union leadership considered adopting the name "Taiwanese Communist Party" but elected not to do so due to the widespread anti-communism in Taiwan at the time.

In the years following its founding, the Labor Party grew in size and influence, with its membership consisting mainly of former political prisoners of the White Terror, labor movement organizers and the working class. The party, however, did not see electoral success until the 2009 local elections, when Labor Party candidate Kao Wei-kai was elected to the Hsinchu County Council. After Kao was elected, a majority of his monthly salary (NT$80,000) was put back into the party's treasury to fund future political activities.

In the 2018 local elections, Kao was reelected to the Hsinchu County Council, alongside Labor Party veteran Luo Mei-wen. The party won a total of two seats in the county council, representing the townships of Hukou and Xinpu.

Ideology 
The Labor Party is nominally socialist and views itself as the ideological successor to the Taiwanese Communist Party. The party opposes the electoral system in Taiwan, calling it a bourgeois democracy, but participates in elections nonetheless.

The Labor Party opposes Taiwan independence and supports the unification of Taiwan with mainland China.

Gallery

Notes

References

External links 
  

1989 establishments in Taiwan
Socialist parties in Taiwan
Labour parties
Political parties established in 1989